JES Air was founded in 1991 and was one of the first privately owned airlines in Bulgaria. The airline was supported with capital from Singapore-based companies. JES Air was famous for its delays, but despite this, passengers used the airline because of the cheap prices it offered.

History

The first route for JES Air was Sofia–New York City, due to an agreement between the two countries, and it then expanded its destinations towards Canada and Asia.

One of the aircraft - LZ-JXB was wet leased to REGION AIR PTE. LTD., Singapore and took place in the creation of the new face of Vietnam Airlines. "JES Air" fell into bankruptcy only one year after it started flights and at the end of 1992 was re-registered in the Middle East and renamed.

Following the bankruptcy, REGION AIR PTE. LTD. had employed ex-JES Air Bulgarian pilots and engineers to continue with the development of Vietnam Airlines.

Destinations

 Melbourne - Melbourne Airport

 Sofia - Sofia Airport

 Ottawa - Macdonald–Cartier Airport

 Singapore - Changi Airport

 Dubai - Dubai Airport

 New York City - John F. Kennedy Airport

 Ho Chi Minh City - Tan Son Nhat Airport second hub

Fleet 
The JES Air fleet included the following aircraft:

Accidents and incidents
4 September 1992: Vietnam Airlines Flight 850, an Airbus A310-200, registration LZ-JXB, leased from Jes Air, with 127 occupants on board en route from Bangkok to Ho Chi Minh City, hijacked by Ly Tong, a former pilot in the Republic of Vietnam Air Force. He then dropped anti-communist leaflets over Ho Chi Minh City before parachuting out. Vietnamese security forces later arrested him on the ground. The aircraft landed safely, and no one on board was injured. He was released from a Hanoi prison in 1998.

Notes

External links

Defunct airlines of Bulgaria
Airlines established in 1991
Airlines disestablished in 1992
1992 disestablishments in Bulgaria
Bulgarian companies established in 1991